Yu-Chiang "Vivian" Hou (born c. 2000) is a Taiwanese professional golfer.

Amateur career
Hou reached number one on the World Amateur Golf Ranking in 2020. She played college golf at the University of Arizona. She was the runner up at the 2021 U.S. Women's Amateur. Her sister Yu-Sang Hou was her teammate at Arizona and her caddy. She won three professional events while still an amateur.

Professional career
Hou turned professional in 2022. She earned status on the LPGA Tour for the 2022 season via the LPGA Q-Series.

Amateur wins
2014 National Middle School - Junior High Championship
2016 Victorian Junior Masters
2018 Third Selection Tournament for Asian Games National Squad

Source:

Professional wins (3)

Taiwan LPGA Tour wins (2)
2018 TLPGA Ladies Open - Nan Pao (as an amateur)
2019 ICTSI Pradera Verde Ladies Classic (as an amateur)

China LPGA Tour wins (1)
2019 Zhangjiagang Shuangshan Challenge (as an amateur)

Team appearances
Amateur
Patsy Hankins Trophy (representing Asia/Pacific): 2018 (winners)

Source:

References

External links

Taiwanese female golfers
LPGA Tour golfers
Arizona Wildcats women's golfers
Living people
Year of birth missing (living people)
Place of birth missing (living people)